Matthew Hair Farm, also known as the Calvin Shaulis Farm and Fruit Crest, is a historic farm and national historic district located at Jenner Township in Somerset County, Pennsylvania. The district includes three contributing buildings and three contributing structures. The buildings are a Georgian-inspired vernacular brick house (1817), Germanic-influenced bank barn (c. 1870), and a kitchen / spring house (c. 1850).  The house is a -story, double pile, modified central passage dwelling with a gable roof.  It features a shed roof front porch. The structures are a 20th-century man-made pond, a cistern, and a windmill to pump water to the cistern.

It was listed on the National Register of Historic Places in 1996.

References 

Houses on the National Register of Historic Places in Pennsylvania
Historic districts on the National Register of Historic Places in Pennsylvania
Georgian architecture in Pennsylvania
Houses completed in 1817
Houses in Somerset County, Pennsylvania
National Register of Historic Places in Somerset County, Pennsylvania
Farms on the National Register of Historic Places in Pennsylvania
1817 establishments in Pennsylvania